Platismatia erosa is a species of corticolous (bark-dwelling), foliose lichen in the family Parmeliaceae. Found in Asia, it was formally described as a new species in 1968 by William and Chicita Culberson. The species epithet erosa refers to the "eroded" quality of the reticulations on the upper thallus surface. The lichen has been recorded from Japan, Taiwan, Java, Vietnam, Nepal, the Philippines, and Sikkim, and Tibet. Chemical analysis of the lichen (using thin-layer chromatography) revealed two lichen products previously unknown in genus Platismatia, pannaric acid and jackinic acid. Two chemotypes of P. erosa have been identified, containing different proportions of these substances.

References

Parmeliaceae
Lichen species
Lichens described in 1968
Lichens of India
Lichens of Japan
Lichens of Malesia
Taxa named by William Louis Culberson
Taxa named by Chicita F. Culberson